V P M Samy is an Indian politician from Puducherry.

He was elected to the Rajya Sabha, the Upper House of the India Parliament, for the term 1977-1983 from the All India Anna Dravida Munnetra Kazhagam Party.

References

Year of birth missing
Possibly living people
Rajya Sabha members from Puducherry
All India Anna Dravida Munnetra Kazhagam politicians